This article details the fixtures and results of the Indonesia national football team in 2004.

Men's senior team

Fixtures and results

FIFA 'A' matches 

2004
2004–05 in Indonesian football
2003–04 in Indonesian football
Indonesia